Resist Convenience is the second full-length album from Folly. It was released on March 10, 2006, and follows on from their first release, Insanity Later. The songs "False Evidence Appearing Real" and "The Wake" have been featured on their MySpace page. The song "Broken" originally appeared on the band's 2002 Demo. Guest vocals include Logan Laflotte of Paulson.

Track listing
"Brooks Wuz Here"
"Bonfire of the Manatees"
"False Evidence Appearing Real"
"Odds > Evens"
"The Wake"
"Human Bodies"
"We Still Believe..."
"Historian"
"Broken"
"Forfeit Sundials"
"All the King's Horses"
"Operation: Work; Lift-Face"

Personnel
 Jon Tummillo - Vocals
 Geoff Towle - Guitar
 Agim Colaku - Guitar
 Arben Colaku - Bass
 Anthony Wille - Drums

References

2006 albums
Folly (band) albums
Triple Crown Records albums